WTTX-FM (107.1 MHz) is a non-commercial radio station licensed to Appomattox, Virginia, serving Appomattox County.  It airs a Southern Gospel radio format, simulcast from WXRI Winston-Salem, as part of the Joy FM network.  WTTX-FM is owned and operated by Baker Family Stations with the license held by Positive Alternative Radio, Inc.

Translators
In addition to the main station, WTTX-FM is relayed by FM translators to widen its broadcast area.

References

External links
 Joy FM Online
 

Radio stations established in 1976
1976 establishments in Virginia
Southern Gospel radio stations in the United States
TTX-FX